The University of Wisconsin–Whitewater (UW–Whitewater or UWW) is a public university in Whitewater, Wisconsin. It is part of the University of Wisconsin System. Student enrollment in the 2014–2015 academic year was more than 12,000. The university offers 47 undergraduate majors and 13 graduate programs. Approximately 1,400 faculty and staff are employed by the university, and the student body consists of individuals from about 40 states and 30 countries.

History
On April 21, 1868, the school was named Whitewater Normal School and graduated its first class of teachers in June, 1870.

Albert Salisbury, writing in 1893, remarked: "The young men and women who gathered into this school in those early years found here a new and stimulating atmosphere. The spirit of earnestness–almost a severe earnestness,–pervaded the place; and the high ideals of its administration were contagious in a remarkable degree."

Salisbury wrote of a unique tradition of the school known as "Students' Day." One day during the term, faculty would, unannounced, be entirely absent from the school. Once students recognized that the day must be "Students' Day", they would elect a President and Faculty from amongst themselves who would take up the regular duties of the day. The annual catalogue stated the purpose of "Students' Day" as the following: "The object of thus putting the institution under the care of the students is to test their moral culture, their executive ability, and their devotion to their work."

In 1927, the school received authority to grant baccalaureate degrees in education and its name was changed to Whitewater Teachers College. With the addition of the liberal arts programs in 1951 it became Wisconsin State College–Whitewater, and was later designated a Wisconsin State University in 1964.

In 1971, after the merger of the former University of Wisconsin and the former Wisconsin State Universities, the school became part of the University of Wisconsin System and has had the name of University of Wisconsin–Whitewater since then.

Campus

The University of Wisconsin–Whitewater encompasses 400 acres in southeastern Wisconsin. The iconic landmark of the university's campus, Old Main, was destroyed by fire on February 7, 1970. The school's oldest building, it was the only one that had been part of the original campus. The east wing of Old Main, now called Hyer Hall, is all that remains of the building. It houses many of the university's administrative offices, in addition to classrooms and lecture halls. After the fire that destroyed Old Main the building's carillon bell was removed and installed in front of the Alumni Center. Now an electronic carillon bell rings regularly throughout the day.

The James R. Conner University Center occupies the heart of campus. The "UC" contains a bowling alley, an art gallery, a stage for live music, a coffee shop, and several dining options. Young Auditorium, the largest performing arts venue on campus, hosts dance, music, theatre, comedy, and other university events. The UW-Whitewater Nature Preserve is located in the northeast corner of campus and consists of 110 acres of various ecosystems such as woodlands, wetlands, and prairie. In addition to serving as an outdoor classroom and laboratory the preserve includes recreational trails for running, hiking, cross-country skiing, or biking.

Academics

University Honors Program
The University Honors Program provides students the opportunity to participate in academic activities, such as field trips and honors courses, and to graduate with University Honors.

Undergraduate Research Program
Students participating in the Undergraduate Research Program receive a grant and work with a faculty mentor on a project that the student designs. Most departments on campus have students and faculty mentors who participate in undergraduate research projects.

Research Apprenticeship Program
The Research Apprenticeship Program (RAP) provides a paid opportunity to assist faculty and staff with their research. This opportunity is open to freshman and sophomore students, transfer students, returning nontraditional students, and international exchange students.

Student government
Whitewater Student Government (WSG) is the students' governing body. It consists of a senate, a president, a vice president and an executive board. WSG has the primary responsibility for the formulation and review of policies concerning student life, services, and interests according to Wisconsin State Statute 36.09(5).

The organization also provides services to students on campus. It hosts an adopt-a-lot service, where students and organizations can adopt a campus parking lot to clean; provides legal advice through an attorney; offers free income tax assistance to students and community members as part of a joint effort between Student Government, Beta Alpha Psi, the Accounting Department, and the IRS; and maintains updated listings on the WSG website for community housing.

Student life
The University of Wisconsin–Whitewater has over 170 recognized student clubs and organizations.

The Royal Purple
The Royal Purple is the university's independent student newspaper. It has been in publication since 1901.

UWW-TV
UWW-TV is the university's student-run television channel. It provides news, sports, educational and original programming produced entirely by University of Wisconsin–Whitewater students. UWW-TV is part of the campus cable line-up and is located on channel 100.1 in high definition. It is also available around the city of Whitewater on Spectrum cable channel 989.

Jitters Coffee Lounge
Jitters is a student-run coffee house located on the first floor of Wells East Residence Hall.

Ceramics Guild
The Ceramics Guild hosts an annual December/fall semester ceramics sale, often in collaboration with the alloy metalsmithing group. A tradition established in 1977, the sale contributes financially to the UW-Whitewater ceramics program, allowing visiting artists to lecture. To date, over 60 visiting artists have conducted workshops in studio ceramics.

WSUW 91.7 The Edge
The Edge is the campus's student-run radio station broadcasting out of Andersen Library, where they have been broadcasting since 1966. The station broadcasts local news and sports and plays music ranging from jazz and hip-hop to alternative and metal.

Greek system
Fraternities and sororities are involved with annual philanthropy and community service projects, homecoming week activities, socials (also known as exchanges) between other Greek organizations or general student organizations, scholarship opportunities for members, and professional networking skills and opportunities.

North American Interfraternity Conference
Alpha Sigma Phi
Delta Chi
Lambda Chi Alpha
Sigma Tau Gamma

Nationally recognized fraternities
Lambda Chi Alpha
Phi Delta Theta
Tau Kappa Epsilon

Professional fraternity
Phi Mu Alpha Sinfonia

Local
Alpha Sigma (1898)
Phi Chi Epsilon

National Panhellenic Conference
Alpha Gamma Delta
Delta Zeta
Sigma Sigma Sigma

National Association of Latino Fraternal Organizations
Gamma Alpha Omega
Lambda Alpha Upsilon
Zeta Sigma Chi

National Pan-Hellenic Council
Alpha Kappa Alpha
Alpha Phi Alpha
Delta Sigma Theta
Kappa Alpha Psi
Omega Psi Phi
Phi Beta Sigma
Sigma Gamma Rho
Zeta Phi Beta

Athletics

UW–Whitewater is a member of NCAA Division III for athletics. It is a part of the Wisconsin Intercollegiate Athletic Conference (WIAC). The university's athletics teams are nicknamed the Warhawks and are represented by the colors purple and white.

In the 2013–14 academic year, the Warhawks made collegiate sport history by winning the men's football, basketball, and baseball championships. UW-Whitewater is the first school in NCAA history in any division to experience such a three-sport sweep in the same academic year.

One of UW-Whitewater's programs for students with disabilities, Cornerstones for Success, provides athletes with disabilities the opportunity to share their experiences in sports and everyday life with students from across the Midwest. UW-Whitewater also has wheelchair basketball programs for men and women; both teams have won national championships.

Notable people

Alumni

Bidal Aguero – Hispanic political activist and newspaper publisher in Lubbock, Texas; received master's degree in music in 1974 
Earl Arms – journalist; Host of Milwaukee PBS’ Black Nouveau
Merton W. Baker – U.S. Air Force Major General
John Belushi – actor and Saturday Night Live comedian (attended)
Matt Blanchard - Former NFL Quarterback
Gene Brabender – MLB player for Baltimore Orioles and Seattle Pilots/Milwaukee Brewers
Walter B. Calvert – Wisconsin State Representative
James R. Charneski – Wisconsin State Representative
Robert L. Clark – Wisconsin State Representative
Craig Coshun – pre-game host and reporter for Milwaukee Brewers on Fox Sports Network.
Mel J. Cyrak – Wisconsin State Representative
Marc C. Duff – Wisconsin State Representative
Vilnis Ezerins – former football player for Los Angeles Rams 
Edward Grassman – Wisconsin State Representative
Eva Kinney Griffith – journalist, temperance activist, novelist, newspaper editor, journal publisher
B. Gunar Gruenke – president of Conrad Schmitt Studios
Kenn Hoekstra – game developer and producer at Pi Studios
Isabella Hofmann – actress (attended)
Jim Holperin – Wisconsin State Senator
G. Erle Ingram – Wisconsin State Senator
Jeff Jagodzinski –  football coach for Green Bay Packers and Boston College
Arthur J. Jones – politician
Neal Kedzie – State Senator
Dave Kraayeveld – NFL player
 Ken Kratz (born 1960-61) - lawyer, former district attorney of Calumet County, Wisconsin; law license was suspended for four months after sexting scandal
Jake Kumerow – NFL wide receiver for the Buffalo Bills
Lance Leipold - football head coach, University of Wisconsin–Whitewater,University of Buffalo,University of Kansas
Bill Lobenstein – former football player for Denver Broncos

Thomas A. Loftus – Ambassador to Norway 1993-97; former speaker of State Assembly
Barbara Lorman – Wisconsin State Senator
John T. Manske – Wisconsin State Representative
Max Maxfield – Wyoming state auditor (1999–2007), Secretary of State (2007–15)
 Quinn Meinerz football player for the Denver Broncos
Grant R. Mulder – U.S. Air Force Major General
Stephen Nass – Wisconsin State Senator
Mark Neumann – U.S. Congressman
Reince Priebus – Former Chairman of Republican National Committee and former White House Chief of Staff
Randall J. Radtke – Wisconsin State Representative
A. J. Raebel – football player for Minnesota Vikings and Saskatchewan Roughriders
Stuart Rindy – former football player for Chicago Bears
John W. Scherer – TV's video professor
Pete Schmitt – former football player for Washington Redskins
Derek Stanley – former football player for St. Louis Rams
Quint Studer – founder and CEO of health care consulting company Studer Group, co-owner of Pensacola Blue Wahoos
Eric Studesville – assistant coach for Denver Broncos, 2010 interim head coach
Matt Turk – NFL punter
Robin Vos – Speaker of Wisconsin State Assembly
Joan Wade – Wisconsin State Representative
Bob Wickman – baseball player for New York Yankees, Milwaukee Brewers, Arizona Diamondbacks
Dwight A. York – Wisconsin State Representative
Kay Lertsittichai - YouTube vlogger, actor

Faculty
Thomas Chrowder Chamberlin, founder of The Journal of Geology
Brian Coppola, noted chemist
Andrea Nye, Professor Emerita of the  Philosophy and Religious Studies Department. 
Alison Townsend, poet
Warren S. Johnson, professor of natural science; Johnson invented the first automatic multi-zone temperature control system and went on to establish Johnson Electric Service Company (now known as Johnson Controls).

References

External links

 

 
University of Wisconsin-Whitewater
Whitewater
Education in Walworth County, Wisconsin
Educational institutions established in 1868
Buildings and structures in Walworth County, Wisconsin
Tourist attractions in Walworth County, Wisconsin
1868 establishments in Wisconsin
Whitewater, Wisconsin